Rancho De La Luna is a recording studio in Joshua Tree, California that was founded in 1993 by Fred Drake and David Catching. After Drake's death in 2002 to cancer, the studio was operated by David Catching and Drake's collaborators Tony Mason, Ted Quinn, Dean Chamberlain, Billy Bizeau and Fred Burke until 2004. It has since doubled as Catching's home, where he has been known to cook for bands, as well as produce records.

The studio is cited as everything in it being "weird, but functional", filled with idiosyncratic recording gear and a raw desert vibe curated by studio owner (and guitarist) Dave Catching.

It is most well known for being the home of the Desert Sessions.  (including sessions with Josh Homme, Alain Johannes, Natasha Schneider, Dean Ween, Twiggy Ramirez, Joey Castillo,  Pete Stahl, Mario Lalli, Troy van Leeuwen, Nick Oliveri, Brant Bjork, Chris Goss, Ben Shepherd, Alfredo Hernandez, David Catching, Brian O'Connor, Jesse Hughes)

According to Catching: "There is something about this studio. Everyone that's been here and recorded here feels it, so there is something to it. Maybe it's just all the love that's here from over the years. People do freak out about the drum room: they say it's the best drum sound they have gotten—even the engineers."

Catching has talked about the special nature of the studio in multiple sources. and due to the pastoral and unique location it is a favorite spot for tech gear spotlights. Many artists have talked about the relaxed and easy nature of the studio, citing the lack of distraction and easy availability of unique and interesting instruments as welcoming and unique.

Alain Johannes explains: "Everything is the opposite of a, quote-unquote, professional studio: 'What is this – are you sure it's a mic? It looks like a grenade…' You plug it in… find out if it goes off."

Notable bands and artists to record at the Rancho De La Luna 
 Arctic Monkeys
 Barb Wire Dolls
 Brant Bjork
 Bingo's Dream Band
 CKY
 Daniel Lanois
 Dave Grohl
 Desert Sessions (including sessions with Josh Homme, Alain Johannes, Natasha Schneider, Dean Ween, Twiggy Ramirez, Joey Castillo,  Pete Stahl, Mario Lalli, Troy van Leeuwen, Nick Oliveri, Brant Bjork, Chris Goss, Ben Shepherd, Alfredo Hernandez, David Catching, Brian O'Connor, Jesse Hughes)
 Dot Hacker
 The Duke Spirit
 Eagles of Death Metal
 Earth
 earthlings?
 Eighties Matchbox B-Line Disaster
 Fatso Jetson
 Foo Fighters featuring Joe Walsh
 Fu Manchu
 The Gama Sennin
 The Giraffes
 Goatsnake
 Gutter Twins (Mark Lanegan and Greg Dulli)
 Household Gods (David Pajo of Slint, Vern Rumsey of Unwound)
 Hulk
 Iggy Pop
 John McBain
 Josh Freese
 Kurt Vile 
 Kyuss
 Mark Lanegan
 Masters of Reality
 Mondo Generator
 Midget Handjob featuring Keith Morris
 Mojave Lords
 The Mutants 
 Nine50nine featuring Dave Krusen and Ty Willman
 Philiac
 PINS
 PJ Harvey
 Queens of the Stone Age
 Skegss
 Sky Valley Mistress
 Smith & Pyle
 Sparta
 Tinariwen
 Twilight Singers
 UNKLE
 Victoria Williams
 Wool

Rancho De La Luna Mezcal 
In 2016, David Catching and Bingo Richey released a signature brand of Mezcal named after the studio. Built, in part, off of the "massive consumption" of liquor at the studio for sessions.

Rancho De La Luna in other media 
The studio was also the focus of the fifth episode of the Foo Fighters Sonic Highways series 

Anthony Bourdain filmed an episode of No Reservations at the Rancho De La Luna.

The studio is also featured heavily in the documentary American Valhalla, which chronicles the creation of the Post Pop Depression record by Iggy Pop and ensuing tour.

References

External links
ranchodelaluna.com - official website

Recording studios in California
1993 establishments in California
Companies based in San Bernardino County, California